The Catalan Cycling Week (Setmana Catalana de Ciclisme in Catalan) was a multi-stage road bicycle race held in Catalonia, Spain. Held annually from 1963 until 2005, it was run as a 2.HC race on the UCI Europe Tour in the second half of March. The Setmana Catalana was discontinued in 2006 due to financial problems and is no longer on the UCI Calendar. Since 2010, the Volta a Catalunya, Catalonia's oldest existing cycling race, was moved to the calendar slot formerly held by the Setmana Catalana in late March.

The first winner of the race was José Pérez-Francés in 1963. Six riders have won the race twice: Spaniards José Pérez-Francés and Luis Ocaña, Belgian Eddy Merckx, Swiss Alex Zülle, Dutchman Michael Boogerd and Frenchman Laurent Jalabert. Alberto Contador was the last to win in 2005.

Winners

References

UCI Europe Tour races
Cycle races in Catalonia
Recurring sporting events established in 1963
1963 establishments in Spain
Recurring sporting events disestablished in 2005
Defunct cycling races in Spain
2005 disestablishments in Spain
Super Prestige Pernod races